John Paul De Cecco (April 18, 1925 – November 2, 2017) was an American academic. He was a professor of psychology at San Francisco State University, the editor-in-chief of the Journal of Homosexuality from 1975 to 2009, and a "pioneer of sexuality studies."

Early life
John Paul De Cecco was born on April 18, 1925, in Erie, Pennsylvania. He had four siblings, and he was of Italian descent. His father was a restaurant and property owner. His three maternal uncles were members of the Mafia who "married prostitutes."

De Cecco graduated from Allegheny College, where he earned a bachelor of science degree in biology in 1946. He subsequently earned a master's degree and a Ph.D. in European history from the University of Pennsylvania, in 1949 and 1953 respectively. He took additional coursework in educational psychology at Michigan State University. He also attended Columbia University in 1968-1970.

Academic career and political activism
De Cecco became an assistant professor of education and psychology at San Francisco State University in 1960. He eventually became a full professor of psychology.

De Cecco took part in the opposition to United States involvement in the Vietnam War. He was a member of the Gay Activists Alliance and the faculty adviser of the Gay Students Coalition at SFSU, co-founded by Mark Thompson. With Michael G. Shively, De Cecco was the co-founder of the Center for Homosexual Education, Evaluation and Research (CHEER) at SFSU in 1975. De Cecco served as editor-in-chief of the Journal of Homosexuality from 1975 to 2009. Additionally, he was a "member and sponsor" of the GLBT Historical Society.

De Cecco was the author of several books.

Personal life, death and legacy
De Cecco resided in the Potrero Hill neighborhood of San Francisco, where he died on November 2, 2017, at age 92. He was described as a "pioneer of sexuality studies" who had been "in the forefront of three decades of change in gay-related academia".

He received the 1992 Magnus Hirschfeld Medal.

Selected works

References

1925 births
2017 deaths
American people of Italian descent
People from Erie, Pennsylvania
Allegheny College alumni
University of Pennsylvania alumni
Michigan State University alumni
San Francisco State University faculty
LGBT studies academics
LGBT people from Pennsylvania
Gay academics
American gay writers